Lacaille 8760 (AX Microscopii) is a red dwarf star in the constellation Microscopium. It is one of the nearest stars to the Sun at about 12.9 light-years' distance, and the brightest M dwarf star in Earth's night sky, although it is generally too faint to be seen without a telescope. At an apparent magnitude of +6.7, it may only be visible to the unaided eye under exceptionally good viewing conditions, under dark skies.

This star was originally listed in a 1763 catalog that was published posthumously by the French Abbé Nicolas Louis de Lacaille. He observed it in the southern sky while working from an observatory at the Cape of Good Hope. Number 8760 was assigned to this star in 1847 edition of Lacaille's catalogue of 9766 stars by Francis Baily.

In the past Lacaille 8760 has been classified anywhere from spectral class K7 down to M2. In 1979 the Irish astronomer Patrick Byrne discovered that it is a flare star, and it was given the variable star designation AX Microscopii, or AX Mic. As a flare star it is relatively quiescent, only erupting on average less than once per day.

Lacaille 8760 is one of the largest and brightest red dwarfs known, with about 60% the mass and 51% the radius of the Sun. It is about five billion years old and is spinning at a projected rotational velocity of 3.3 km/s, giving it a rotation period of roughly 40 days. The star is radiating 7.2% of the luminosity of the Sun from its photosphere at an effective temperature of 3,800 K.

Despite efforts by astronomers, as of 2011 no planets had been detected in orbit around this star.

Lacaille 8760 orbits around the galaxy with a relatively high ellipticity of 0.23. Its closest approach to the Sun occurred about 20,000 years ago when it came within . Due to its low mass (60% of the Sun), it has an expected lifespan of about 75 billion (seven times longer than the Sun's.

References

External links
 SolStation article

M-type main-sequence stars
BY Draconis variables
Flare stars
Local Bubble

Microscopium
CD-39 14192
0825
202560
105090
Microscopii, AX